Bzyb (Bzyph, Bzipi) is an urban-type settlement located in the Gagra District of Abkhazia, Georgia. Next to the river Bzyb. There is a 9th-10th-century church, now in ruins and a medieval fortress nearby. The town became less important when the fortress was destroyed and the town passed into the control of the clan of Inal-Ipa, which perhaps branched off around 1730 from Abkhazia's princely house, the Shervashidze.

Demographics
At the time of the 2011 Census, Bzyb had a population of 4,719. Of these, 54.7% were Abkhaz, 27.5% Armenians, 10.7% Russians, 3.7% Georgians, 0.9% Ukrainians and 0.3% Greeks

See also
 Gagra District

Notes

References

Gagra District Administration

Populated places in Gagra District